Ruslan Karimov (born 22 May 1986) is an Uzbek former professional cyclist.

Major results
Sources: 

2004
 Asian Junior Road Championships
4th Road race
8th Time trial
2005
 2nd Road race, National Road Championships
2006
 3rd Overall Tour de Korea
2007
 1st  Road race, National Road Championships
2010
 National Road Championships
1st  Time trial
2nd Road race
 3rd Circuito del Porto
 5th Piccolo Giro di Lombardia
 10th Tour of Taihu Lake
2011
 2nd Road race, National Road Championships
 5th Trofeo Franco Balestra
 5th Circuito del Porto
2014
 1st  Road race, National Road Championships
 9th Road race, Asian Road Championships
2015
 1st  Road race, National Road Championships
2017
 National Road Championships
1st  Road race
2nd Time trial
2018
 3rd Road race, National Road Championships

References

External links
 

1986 births
Living people
Uzbekistani male cyclists
Cyclists at the 2010 Asian Games
Cyclists at the 2014 Asian Games
Asian Games competitors for Uzbekistan
21st-century Uzbekistani people